The Jewry Wall Museum is a museum in Leicester in the East Midlands of England. It was built in the 1960s, facing the Jewry Wall ruins in a building shared with Vaughan College. It housed artefacts from Iron Age, Roman, and medieval Leicester. With the ending of Vaughan College's use of the building in 2013, the whole site was acquired by the city council, and expansion and improvement plans were put in place.

Jewry Wall site
The area west of the Jewry Wall was excavated by Kathleen Kenyon between 1936 and 1939, resulting in a set of bath house foundations a considerable depth below street level. When post-war reconstruction got underway, what became Vaughan Way required the destruction of the old Vaughan Working Men's College, and the outcome was that the area alongside the Roman foundations was used for a new building which combined both the Adult learning college and a new museum to house Leicester's growing collection of Roman and medieval archaeological finds.

The building
Construction began in 1960 and finished two years later; the building was designed by Trevor Dannatt.

The museum is run by Leicester City Council and is free to enter.

In 2004, as part of a scheme of cost-cutting on the part of Leicester City Council, it was proposed that the opening hours at the Jewry Wall Museum would be reduced. An interest group was created in response, and the Friends of Jewry Wall Museum have been actively promoting the museum since.

Regardless of this, Leicester City Council reduced the museum's opening times to save money, and the museum is closed for several months over the winter. Councillor John Mugglestone rationalised the decision at the time, saying: "At Jewry Wall, we have more curators than visitors".

The museum was threatened again in 2011, when Leicester City Council announced plans to close the museum (along with two others in the city) to save money. This decision was overturned following a motion by the City Council's backbench Labour Councillors, led by former Labour Council leader Ross Willmott.

Expansion plans
The University of Leicester had been the owner of the building, with the museum holding a secure long-term tenancy of the ground floor, In 2013 the University announced that it was no longer to use the building for its lifelong learning activities and put it up for sale. In March 2016 Leicester City Council was able to buy the building, and began a process of improvements and expansion of the Museum, which could be spread over both floors and improve access and visibility of both the museum and Roman ruins. The quantity of Roman material has expanded greatly in recent years as developers have been required to carry out full archaeological works while redeveloping sites across the city.

Notable holdings

Notes

External links

 

Museums in Leicester
Grade II listed buildings in Leicestershire
Museums of ancient Rome in the United Kingdom
Archaeological museums in England